Rafael Barišić, O.F.M. (24 June 1796 – 14 August 1863) was a Bosnian-Herzegovinian Croat prelate of the Catholic Church who served as the apostolic vicar of Herzegovina from 1847 to his death in 1863 and apostolic vicar of Bosnia from 1832 to 1847.

Early life 

Barišić was born in Oćevija, a small village near Vareš, at the time part of Bosnia Eyalet of the Ottoman Empire. His father was named Marijan, and mother Mara née Pejčinović. His cousin Gabrijel Barešić was also a Franciscan who served as the bishop of Lezhë (in present-day Albania) in Rumelia Eyalet. On 16 April 1817, Barišić entered a novitiate at the Franciscan friary in Kraljeva Sutjeska. A year later he gave his vows. At the time, the Franciscan Province of Bosnia sent its friars for education in Italy or Hungary, since there were no established institutions for the education of clergy in Bosnia at the time. Thus, Barišić was sent for education in Torino, where he finished his studies with great success. In Torino, he held a public discussion from philosophy, which served as a condition for licentiate for the professorship and for the so-called rigorous exams. His thesis was titled in Latin as Conclusiones selectae ex universa philosophia. In 1823 he held a public discussion from theology titled Theses ex Theologia selectae. After successfully defending both of his thesis, and after finishing the rigorous exams, he gained the title of general lector. He lectured philosophy in Torino, and theology in Bologna. Because of the lack of priests in Bosnia, the Province requested Barišić to return in 1827, and there he was appointed the Province's secretary and director of education. In 1830, Barišić was appointed a parson in Zovik in northern Bosnia.

Apostolic Vicar of Bosnia 

On 27 March 1832, Barišić was appointed Apostolic Vicar of Bosnia and the titular bishop of Ashdod (in present-day Israel). He was consecrated on 30 September 1832 in Đakovo in Austrian Empire. Immediately after his consecration, Barišić traveled to the capital, Vienna, in an effort to gain permission from Ferdinand I of Austria for the establishment of a seminary for the education of the Bosnian Franciscans, that would be governed by the Franciscan Province of Bosnia. At the same time, he asked the emperor to help the Catholics in Bosnia and Herzegovina, especially with gaining a ferman from the sultan for the improvement of the lives of Catholics and to prevent qadis (the Muslim judges) to officiate Catholic weddings. Barišić returned to Bosnia in December 1832, and was officially installed as apostolic vicar on 5 December 1832 in Kraljeva Sutjeska.

Barišić held a view that he, as a bishop, has the exclusive right to establish parishes and appoint parsons. He tried to establish the church hierarchy in Bosnia, which the Bosnian Franciscans opposed, sawing this as a threat to their privileges. The issue became known as the Barišić Affair, and it split the Bosnian Franciscans to those that supported the new bishop and those that opposed him. Barišić was supported by the Franciscans educated in Italy, while those educated in Austria opposed him. The Barišić Affair became internationalised, and it gained interest from the Pope, the Austrian Emperor, the Ottoman Sultan, and the Ottoman regional government in Travnik. The dispute reached its peak during the tenure of the two Bosnian Provincials – Andrija Kujundžić and Stipe Marijanović. During the visitation of friar Šimun Milanović, the dispute was somewhat mitigated, and the agreement between the bishop and the Bosnian Franciscans was signed on 9 October 1839 and was publicly pronounced by Barišić on 13 January 1840.

On 1 May 1838, Barišić wrote to Ferdinand about the hardships of Catholics in Bosnia and Herzegovina. In 1840, Barišić sent his emissary to Ferdinand, so the Viennese diplomacy could gain another ferman from the sultan that would approve free activity of the bishop in Bosnia, to prevent qadis to officiate Catholic weddings, and to get the protection of Catholics from the Austrian Empire. In December 1840, Abdulmejid I granted him the ferman fulfilling all of his requests. Encouraged by the ferman, Barišić intended to construct the episcopal residence, a chapel, and a seminary near Travnik. However, the dispute with the Bosnian Franciscans resurged once again, and Barišić was recalled to Rome.

While in Rome, Barišić published a prayer book titled Paša duhovna (the Spiritual Pasture). In 1842, he was sent to the Diocese of Bar in Albania to resolve a dispute between the faithful and the clergy, and between the clergy themselves. His mission was successful, and was thus sometimes referred to as "the angel of peace".

Apostolic Vicar of Herzegovina 

Herzegovinian Franciscans, mostly from the friary in Kreševo, who took pastoral care over Herzegovina, decided to establish their own friary in Herzegovina in Široki Brijeg in 1840. Leaders of this initiative were Nikola Kordić, Anđeo Kraljević and Ilija Vidošević. At the time, Barišić had an uneasy relationship with the Bosnian Franciscans. The Herzegovinian Franciscans established contact with Vizier Ali Pasha Rizvanbegović, who was granted his own Herzegovina Eyalet by the Ottoman sultan for his loyalty during the Bosnian uprising. The Franciscans considered that they will build their own friary faster if Barišić would come to Herzegovina.

The parson of Čerigaj friar Ilija Vidošević wrote to Barišić about the idea of establishing a separate Herzegovinian apostolic vicariate, an idea also supported by Ali Pasha. In 1843, Barišić returned from a trip in Albania and stayed in Čerigaj, where Vidošević helped him to establish a connection with Ali Pasha. In 1844, the Church authorities allowed the Franciscans to build a friary in Široki Brijeg, so the Herzegovinian Franciscans left their former friaries to build a new one. In 1845, Barišić wrote to the Propaganda to allow him to move to Herzegovina, stating that form there, he would also serve the Diocese of Trebinje-Mrkan and that Catholics and Muslims there "all love him and want him, including the Vizier".

The main argument of the Herzegovinian Franciscans for the establishment of a special vicariate was the number of parishes and the faithful Catholics in Herzegovina. According to a report from Bishop Augustin Miletić from 1818–19, Herzegovina had 8 parishes and 3,100 Catholic families, with 20,223 Catholics in total. Ten years later, the same bishop reported that there were 51,744 Catholics, a third of the total number of Catholics in Bosnia and Herzegovina.

On 29 October 1845, Barišić informed the Propaganda that he will renounce his office of the apostolic vicar of Bosnia. Rome and Istanbul entered the negotiations about the seat of Barišić, and both were compliant about his transfer to Herzegovina. The Church's negotiator was Anthony Petros IX Hassun. The secretary of the Propaganda wrote to Barišić on 13 March 1846, informing him about the success in the negotiations and called him to resign from the office of the Apostolic Vicar of Bosnia "as soon as possible", which he did.

On 29 April 1846, the Propaganda informed Barišić that he should move to Herzegovina immediately after he receives a ferman of approval from the Sultan. The next day the Rome established an independent vicariate for Herzegovina, and named Barišić the apostolic vicar. Around that time, Barišić, at the time in Istanbul, received the ferman, as well as two letters of approval from Ali Pasha. Barišić was granted a number of privileges, including the guarantee of freedom of religion. He informed the Propaganda about the approval on 26 May 1846. He left Istanbul for Trieste two days later and arrived in Herzegovina on 18 June 1846. The episcopal residence was being built in Vukodol near Mostar, while Barišić resided in Seonica near Županjac (Duvno, present-day Tomislavgrad), where he established his curia. Seonica served as his seat from 18 June 1846 until 2 June 1851. As the existing land parcel in Vukodol was too small for a residence, Ali Pasha bought privately owned land from a local Muslim and granted it to the vicariate, with strong opposition from the Muslim locals. Ali Pasha also provided protection during the construction. The construction was completed at the beginning of 1851, and Barišić moved there on 2 June 1851. After Barišić moved in Mostar, the religious life of the local Catholics flourished. The Catholics from the neighboring hills around Mostar returned to the city and became involved in the public, cultural, and political life of the city.

In June 1861, Barišić became seriously ill. His health deteriorated in 1862, so he moved from Mostar to the Franciscan monastery in Široki Brijeg. Nevertheless, made efforts to build a cathedral church. On 27 May 1862, with the help of Omar Pasha, Barišić was granted land in the centre of Mostar, previously a garden owned by Ali Pasha. The Governor of Mostar reluctantly gave Barišić the approval to build the church on 13 March 1863. However, Barišić never managed to lay the cornerstone of the new church, as he died soon afterward on 14 August 1863.

Notes

References

Books

Journals 

 
 

1796 births
1863 deaths
People from Vareš
Croats of Bosnia and Herzegovina
Franciscans of the Franciscan Province of Bosnia
Franciscan bishops
19th-century Roman Catholic titular bishops
Apostolic vicars
Bishops appointed by Pope Gregory XVI
Bishops appointed by Pope Pius IX
Bosnia and Herzegovina Roman Catholic bishops
19th-century Roman Catholic bishops in the Ottoman Empire